Renaissance Club Athletic Zemamra, known as Renaissance Zemamra or RCA Zemamra, is a football club based in Zemamra, Morocco. As of the 2022–23 season, it plays in the Botola 2, Morocco's second tier division.

History 
After winning the 2018–19 Botola 2, the club gained promotion to Botola for the first time in their history. On 28 June 2022, Zemamra signed with former A.C. Milan player, Hachim Mastour.

Honours
Botola 2
Winners (1): 2018–19

References

Football clubs in Morocco
Sports clubs in Morocco
Association football clubs established in 1977
1977 establishments in Morocco
Sidi Bennour Province